Sir Thomas Vansittart Bowater, 1st Baronet,  (29 October 1862 – 28 March 1938) was a British Conservative Party politician who served as Lord Mayor of London from 1913 to 1914 and as one of the city's Members of Parliament (MPs) from 1924 to 1938.

Career
Bowater was the son of William Vansittart Bowater and his wife, Eliza Jane née Davey. On 8 June 1887, he married Emily Margaret Spencer and they later had six children. From 1905 to 1906, he was a Sheriff of the City of London. In 1906 he was knighted by King Edward VII. Bowater was subsequently elected as Lord Mayor of London in 1913 and on finishing this post a year later, he was created Baronet Bowater, of Hill Crest in the Borough of Croydon. His wife died in 1924 and a year later he married Alice Mary Hoskins. Bowater was later one of two MPs for the City of London from 1924 to 1938. He also held the office of Deputy Lieutenant (DL).

Honours and awards
During his life Bowater received several national and foreign honours:
 Knight Bachelor
 Honorary Colonel of the 10th Royal Fusiliers
 Baronet Bowater, of Hill Crest, Croydon
 Commander of the Order of Leopold of Belgium
 Officer of the Order of the Crown of Belgium
 Commander 1st Class of the Order of Dannebrog of Denmark
 Commander of the Legion of Honour of France
 Grand Commander of the Order of the Redeemer of Greece
 Knight 1st Class of the Order of St. Olaf of Norway

References

External links 
 

1862 births
1938 deaths
Baronets in the Baronetage of the United Kingdom
Conservative Party (UK) MPs for English constituencies
Deputy Lieutenants in England
20th-century lord mayors of London
20th-century English politicians
Sheriffs of the City of London
UK MPs 1924–1929
UK MPs 1929–1931
UK MPs 1931–1935
UK MPs 1935–1945
Members of Parliament of the United Kingdom for the City of London
People from Cheetham Hill